Witloof Bay is a Belgian a cappella group.

Biography 
In 2005 six friends who all shared a love of jazz, pop, a cappella and beatbox decided to perform as a group. They took their inspiration from The Real Group, Take 6, The Swingle Singers and The Singers Unlimited. The band sing both in English and French. The band members themselves also come from all parts of the Belgian kingdom: Wallonia, Flanders and Brussels, thus the group believes they truly represent Belgium as a whole.

In 2008 the group released their first eponymously titled album.

Eurovision 2011
On 12 February 2011, Witloof Bay won the right to represent Belgium in the Eurovision Song Contest 2011. They took part in the second semi-final, held on 12 May 2011, but failed to qualify for the final, losing out by 1 point.

Discography

Album releases

Singles

References

External links
 Witloof Bay snatches Belgian ticket to Düsseldorf

Eurovision Song Contest entrants for Belgium
A cappella musical groups
Eurovision Song Contest entrants of 2011